Óscar Pinto (born 20 April 1962) is a Portuguese fencer. He competed in the individual épée event at the 1988 Summer Olympics.

References

External links
 

1962 births
Living people
Portuguese male épée fencers
Olympic fencers of Portugal
Fencers at the 1988 Summer Olympics